Jägala is a village in Jõelähtme Parish, Harju County, in northern Estonia. Jägala had 139 inhabitants in 2007.

History 
During World War II, the Jägala concentration camp is built and operated next to the village.

References

Villages in Harju County
Kreis Harrien